East Down was a UK Parliament constituency in Ireland which returned one Member of Parliament from 1885 to 1922, using the first past the post electoral system.

Boundaries and Boundary Changes
This county constituency was first created in 1885 from the eastern part of Down. There was a boundary change reducing the size of this division in 1918, when the new Mid Down constituency was created.

1885–1918: The baronies of Dufferin, Kinelarty, Lecale Lower and Lecale Upper, and that part of the barony of Castlereagh Upper not contained in the North Down constituency.

1918–1922: The rural district of Downpatrick, exclusive of the district electoral divisions of Ballynahinch, Kilmore and Leggygowan; the part of the rural district of Kilkeel which consists of the district electoral divisions of Bryansford, Fofanny and Maghera, and the part of the rural district of Banbridge which consists of the district electoral divisions of Ballyward, Crossgar and Leitrim.'.

Maps showing the component units of the constituency can be seen here.

Prior to the 1885 United Kingdom general election and after the dissolution of Parliament in 1922 the area was part of the Down constituency.

Politics
The constituency had an anti-unionist majority in 1918, but its support was split fairly evenly between Nationalist and Sinn Féin candidates. An attempt at a limited electoral pact broke down in this constituency. In a first past the post election this situation produced a minority Unionist win.

Dáil Éireann
Sinn Féin contested the general election of 1918 on the platform that instead of taking up any seats they won in the United Kingdom Parliament, they would establish a revolutionary assembly in Dublin. In republican theory every MP elected in Ireland was a potential Deputy to this assembly. In practice only the Sinn Féin members accepted the offer.

The revolutionary First Dáil of the Irish Republic assembled on 21 January 1919 and last met on 10 May 1921. The First Dáil, according to a resolution passed also on 10 May, was formally dissolved on the assembling of the Second Dáil. This took place on 16 August 1921.

Sinn Féin used the UK-authorised May 1921 elections for the Northern Ireland House of Commons and the House of Commons of Southern Ireland as a poll for the Second Dáil. This area, in republican theory, was incorporated in an eight-member Dáil constituency of Down.

Members of Parliament

Elections

Elections in the 1880s

Elections in the 1890s

Elections in the 1900s

Elections in the 1910s

References

See also
 List of UK Parliament Constituencies in Ireland and Northern Ireland
 Redistribution of Seats (Ireland) Act 1918
 List of MPs elected in the 1918 United Kingdom general election
 List of Dáil Éireann constituencies in Ireland (historic)
 Members of the 1st Dáil

Westminster constituencies in County Down (historic)
Dáil constituencies in Northern Ireland (historic)
Constituencies of the Parliament of the United Kingdom established in 1885
Constituencies of the Parliament of the United Kingdom disestablished in 1922